Kohei Oda (小田 幸平, born March 15, 1977) is a Japanese former professional baseball catcher in Japan's Nippon Professional Baseball. He played with the Yomiuri Giants from 1998 to 2005 and for the Chunichi Dragons from 2006 to 2014.

External links

NPB stats

1977 births
Living people
People from Takasago, Hyōgo
Japanese baseball players
Nippon Professional Baseball catchers
Yomiuri Giants players
Chunichi Dragons players
Baseball people from Hyōgo Prefecture